The 2015 GT Sports Club is the first season of the SRO Group's GT Sports Club, an auto racing series for grand tourer cars. The GT Sports Club is a championship for Bronze and Iron drivers only. Platinum, Gold, Silver and Bronze indicate how professional a driver is. The SRO introduced the new "Iron" categorisation within the Bronze category, for drivers over the age of 60. All drivers must participate with GT3-spec cars, RACB G3 cars or GTE-spec cars. The series maiden race weekend was from 17 to 19 April during the Espíritu de Montjuïc event at Circuit de Barcelona-Catalunya. Max Bianchi won the first overall championship and Martin Lanting won the Iron Cup after the last race of the championship at Misano.

Calendar

Entry list

Race results

Championship standings
Scoring system
Championship points were awarded for the first six positions in each Qualifying Race and for the first ten positions in each Championship Race. Entries were required to complete 75% of the winning driver's race distance in order to be classified and earn points.

Qualifying Race points

Championship Race points

Drivers' Championships

Overall

Iron Cup

Cup Challenge

See also
2015 Blancpain GT Series

References

External links

GT Sports Club
GT Sports Club